Organ Springs is an unincorporated community in Howard Township, Washington County, in the U.S. state of Indiana.

History
Its namesake Organ Spring was so named from the "music" made by the dripping water of a cave.

A post office was established at Organ Springs in 1858, and remained in operation until it was discontinued in 1901.

Geography

References

Unincorporated communities in Washington County, Indiana
Unincorporated communities in Indiana